Ulla West (born 1954 in Trollhättan) is a Swedish artist who lives and works in Stockholm.
                      
Ulla West has had several exhibitions at galleries, both in Sweden and internationally since the 1980s. For example, she exhibited in Japan, Russia and Thailand. In 2007, she was involved in Kaunas Art Biennale and in 2008 in Beijing at the International Fiber Art Biennale. In 2009, she was invited to show in the exhibition "Irreverent, Contemporary Nordic Crafts Art" in San Francisco at Yerba Buena Center for the Arts, YBCA. Her most recent exhibition in Stockholm was on Hallwylska Palatset 2009. Ulla West also work with stage design and costume design for theatres and film- and TV-productions.

Participating in the exhibition Cut my legs off and call me shorty! at Tensta Konsthall summer 2009.

Publications 
Om en robot (About a Robot),  Mormor Publishers, Stockholm (2008)

External links 
Ulla West
Fiber Art Sweden
Interview in Swedish
Art Slant

1954 births
Living people
Swedish artists